Haris Pamboukis (born June 29, 1958 in Athens) is a Greek Professor of private international law and international business transactions at the Athens School of Law, lawyer licensed to practice law before the Supreme Court and ex Minister of State (and for a short period, Deputy Minister of Development) in the government of George Papandreou (2009-2011). He is the author of numerous articles in Greek, English and French, while he has published several legal monographs and political essays.
  
 From 1990 until 1996 he served as chief editor in the Journal Revue Hellenique de Droit International.
 He has given numerous interviews in Greek and international media, part of which have been posted on Google. 
 He has served as General Secretary of Administration and Organisation at the Ministry of Foreign Affairs (1999-2000).
 He is member of the Greek Committee of Nationality and has served as member of the Special Supreme Court.

Biography

Haris Pamboukis was born in Athens in 1958 and has two children.

Legal career

He studied law in Paris (Paris I- Panthéon - Sorbonne) from where he also obtained a PhD with honors in 1990 (Docteur d'Etat en droit). His thesis under the title “L 'acte public étranger en droit international privé”, Lagarde Bibliothèque de Droit Privé, t.219, Paris (1987), was published in 1993 in Librairie de Droit et de la Jurisprudence, has earned several national and international awards, and has been cited internationally in the field of private international law.

He is a lawyer licensed to practice law before the Supreme Court and has served as scientific Supervisor at the Athens Bar Association Committee on modernization of the legal profession. Furthermore, he has appeared as a lawyer before the European Court of Human Rights (Strasbourg) and the Court of the European Union (Luxembourg), while he has also served as arbitrator in many institutional arbitrations (ICC, LCIA) and ad hoc arbitrations. 
He has been elected as member of the Unidroit (1998, Rome), as well as of many national and foreign scientific institutions and legal for a, while he has actively participated in many conferences. He is the representative of the Hellenic Republic in the Hague International Conference, the UNICITRAL.

As a lawyer he specializes in Private International Law, International Business Transactions, International Arbitration and Alternative Dispute Resolution. 
He has experience in mediation and negotiations in international commercial issues and in drafting of legislation in the field of offshore companies, international sales and privatizations. He is a regular member of the Special Court (hearing cases on miscarriage of justice and the salaries of Justices).

Today, he is considered as one of the most pre-eminent lawyers in international litigation, and has founded the law firm PMN-Pamboukis – Maravelis- Nikolaidis & Associates (Alpha Law), a boutique law firm specializing in international transactions and international arbitration.

Academic career

In 1991, he was unanimously elected as lecturer at the Athens Law School and since October 2009, upon unanimous election, he has been a Professor of Private International Law and International Business Transactions at the Athens Law School.

He teaches at the under graduate and post graduate level Private International Law, International Business Transactions and International Arbitration.

In 2003, he taught a course at the Hague Academy of International Law, under the title “Droit international privé holistique: droit uniforme et droit international privé”, which was published in the essays of the Hague Academy of International Law in 2008.

Since 2014, he has been responsible for the supervision and guidance of a group of undergraduate students of the Athens Law School, which participated in Willem C. Vis International Commercial Arbitration Moot 2015 (https://vismoot.pace.edu/), a university competition on international commercial arbitration held in Vienna (27 March- 2 April 2015), and which was ranked between the positions 9-16, among 299 universities that participated from all around the world.

Political career

He has served as special counsel to the Deputy Minister of Foreign Affairs (1996-1997) and subsequently as General Secretary of Administration and Organisation at the Ministry of Foreign Affairs (1999—2000), under the Prime Minister, George Papandreou. During that period (1999) he participated in the preparation of the Elsinki (which was very important for the Greek- Turkish relations) and the Copenhagen Conference, where the unconditional admission of Cyprus in the EU was decided.

In October 2009, he was appointed as Minister of State in the government of George Papandreou. During that period, he was considered as the mind behind the geopolitical plan to make an opening to the BRIC countries (Russia, China), the Arab world and Israel 2010.

In his capacity as Minister, he publicly expressed his views in favour of the political unity and civil consultation, during an interview in Ethnos he suggested the creation of a Marshall development program, while he identified as a serious key problem the existence of many and bad made laws, by suggesting a plan for the settling of the laws for the rule of law to be reestablished.

He also suggested the creation of a distinguished authority of the Prime Minister, a type of a Ministry belonging to the Prime Minister, a plan that was never completed, and a complete plan on continuous governance. 
During the government reshuffle in September 2010, his responsibilities focused on attracting foreign strategic investments, without having any substantive responsibilities as to their implementation.

He construed and passed the law on fast track (which also reflects his personal political philosophy on growth) which limited the bureaucracy and facilitated large investments. In the field of attracting investments, he signed in New York a memorandum of cooperation with Qatar of a value of 5 billion, prepared the exploitation of Ellinikon, (former airport) by drafting a plan and creating the company Elliniko S.A., and contributed to the determination of the compensation due by Siemens for moral damages incurred by the Greek state.

He was also the mind behind and the coordinator of the drafting of the laws on transparency and the amendment of the Greek Code on insolvency (former article 99 thereof).

In June 2011, he was appointed as Deputy Minister of Mercantile Shipping and suggested the recovery of the Ministry of Mercantile, a proposal that was not accepted. He resigned from his post for this reason and due to broader disagreement, on 25 August 2011.

His resignation was welcomed by all media and the society, and at the present time he is not actively involved in politics, but he still enjoys broader political and social recognition for his intelligence, expertise and his integrity.

Other activities

Professor Haris Pamboukis has given numerous interviews in the Greek and International media, among others, in Bloomberg, CNN, ARTE and Fox China. He has also written articles for almost all prestigious Greek newspapers, as well as in the French Le Monde, the Huffigton Post and others, either on his own or in cooperation with Jacques Attali.

He has published his opinion about the society and politics world in four books:

 “Peri Elpidas” - A Greek national plan to overcome economic crisis, Ant. Livanis Publications, 2016
 “Logos Koinos”, Ant. Livanis Publications, 2007 
 “Higher Education of the Future”, Ant. Livanis Publications, 2007. 
 “Three aspirations”, Ant. Livanis Publications, 2006.

Finally, he has been awarded with the Honorary Distinction “Légion d’honneur - commandeur” by the President of the French Republic.

References

 
 Academin Website (in Greek)
 Publications

1958 births
PASOK politicians
Ministers of State (Greece)
Living people
Politicians from Athens